The Sabah Chinese Party or  (PCS) is a minor party which was formed in 1980 to represent the Chinese community in Sabah.

Party logo

See also 
 Politics of Malaysia
 List of political parties in Malaysia

References

Defunct political parties in Sabah
1986 establishments in Malaysia
Political parties established in 1986
Ethnic political parties